Khushi ( Happiness) is a 2003 Indian Hindi romantic comedy film released on 7 February 2003. It is a remake of the 2000 Tamil film Kushi. This film starring Fardeen Khan and Kareena Kapoor in main roles and was directed by S. J. Suryah and produced by Boney Kapoor. It was a flop at box office.

Plot 
Khushi tells the story of a boy and girl, who are in love, but are kept apart by their inflated egos.

Karan is born in Kolkata, while Khushi is born in a village in Uttarakhand. Karan intends going to Canada for further studies, but, due to an accident, is forced to enroll in the Mumbai University. Khushi's father believes that she has studied enough and should now marry a boy who is ready to be his ghar-jamai. But Khushi insists on pursuing her education at Mumbai University.

At the University, Karan meets Khushi through common friends, Vicky and Priya. These common friends fall in love with each other and it is up to Karan and Khushi to bring them together. In the process, the two fall in love. But with ego in the way, the two never get to express their love for each other till the time comes to bid goodbye. In the ending it is revealed that Khushi and Karan are celebrating their 9th wedding anniversary.

Cast

Soundtrack 
The film's soundtrack contains 6 songs, all composed by Anu Malik. According to the Indian trade website Box Office India, with around 1.2 million units sold, this film's soundtrack album was the year's tenth highest-selling. The song "Jiya Maine Jiya" was taken from the song "Cheliya" from the Telugu movie Kushi.

References

External links 
 
 

2000s Hindi-language films
2003 films
Films directed by S. J. Suryah
Films scored by Anu Malik
Hindi remakes of Tamil films